Fairntosh Plantation is a historic plantation house and complex located near Durham, Durham County, North Carolina.  It consists of two separate Georgian / Federal style houses joined in a "T"-shape.  The rear section is older, and is a two-story, side hall plan structure with a center-hall plan.  The larger section is a two-story, five bay by three bay structure. Also on the property are the contributing outbuildings including a two-story kitchen, slave quarters, smokehouse, dairy, office schoolhouse and other dependencies.

It was listed on the National Register of Historic Places in 1973.

References

Plantation houses in North Carolina
Houses on the National Register of Historic Places in North Carolina
Georgian architecture in North Carolina
Federal architecture in North Carolina
Houses completed in 1800
Houses in Durham County, North Carolina
National Register of Historic Places in Durham County, North Carolina
Slave cabins and quarters in the United States